The Edwards–Franklin House is a plantation house in the Southern United States located in Franklin Township, Surry County, North Carolina.  It was built in 1799 by Gideon Edwards and was later occupied by congressional representative Meshack Franklin, brother of North Carolina governor Jesse Franklin (1820–1821).  The house was restored by the Surry County Historical Society in 1973 and is open to visitors.

It was added to the National Register of Historic Places in 1973.

References

External links

 Edwards–Franklin House – visiting information

Houses on the National Register of Historic Places in North Carolina
Georgian architecture in North Carolina
Federal architecture in North Carolina
Houses completed in 1799
Plantation houses in North Carolina
Houses in Surry County, North Carolina
Museums in Surry County, North Carolina
Historic house museums in North Carolina
National Register of Historic Places in Surry County, North Carolina